Beřovice is a municipality and village in Kladno District in the Central Bohemian Region of the Czech Republic. It has about 400 inhabitants.

Administrative parts
The village of Bakov is an administrative part of Beřovice.

References

Villages in Kladno District